The 2012 WGC-Bridgestone Invitational was a professional golf tournament held August 2–5 on the South Course of Firestone Country Club in Akron, Ohio. It was the 14th WGC-Bridgestone Invitational tournament, and the third of four World Golf Championships events held in 2012. Keegan Bradley shot a 64 (−6) in the final round to finish with 267 (−13) to win his first WGC event, one stroke ahead of runners-up Jim Furyk and Steve Stricker.

Venue

Course layout
The South Course was designed by Bert Way and redesigned by Robert Trent Jones in 1960.

Field
The field consisted of players drawn primarily from the Official World Golf Ranking and the winners of the world-wide tournaments with the strongest fields.

1. Playing members of the 2011 United States and International Presidents Cup teams.
Robert Allenby, Aaron Baddeley, K. J. Choi (2,3), Jason Day (2,3), Ernie Els (2,3,4), Jim Furyk (2,3), Retief Goosen, Bill Haas (2,3,4), Ryo Ishikawa, Dustin Johnson (2,3,4), Matt Kuchar (2,3,4), Kim Kyung-tae, Hunter Mahan (2,3,4), Phil Mickelson (2,3,4), Geoff Ogilvy (2,3), Charl Schwartzel (2,3), Adam Scott (2,3,4), Steve Stricker (2,3,4), David Toms (2,3), Nick Watney (2,3), Bubba Watson (2,3,4), Tiger Woods (2,3,4), Y. E. Yang
Webb Simpson (2,3,4) did not compete for personal reasons.

2. The top 50 players from the Official World Golf Ranking as of July 23, 2012.
Bae Sang-moon (3), Thomas Bjørn (3,4), Keegan Bradley (3,4), Jonathan Byrd (3), Rafa Cabrera-Bello (3,4), Nicolas Colsaerts (3,4), Luke Donald (3,4), Jason Dufner (3,4), Simon Dyson (3,4), Gonzalo Fernández-Castaño (3,4), Rickie Fowler (3,4), Sergio García (3,4), Peter Hanson (3), Freddie Jacobson (3), Zach Johnson (3,4), Martin Kaymer (3,4), Martin Laird (3), Paul Lawrie (3,4), Graeme McDowell (3), Rory McIlroy (3,4), Francesco Molinari (3,4), Kevin Na (3), Louis Oosthuizen (3,4), Carl Pettersson (3,4), Ian Poulter (3,5), Álvaro Quirós (3,4), Justin Rose (3,4), John Senden (3), Brandt Snedeker (3,4), Bo Van Pelt (3), Lee Westwood (3,5), Mark Wilson (3,4)

3. The top 50 players from the Official World Golf Ranking as of July 30, 2012.

4. Tournament winners of worldwide events since the prior year's tournament with an Official World Golf Ranking Strength of Field Rating of 115 points or more.
Greg Chalmers, Ben Crane, Jamie Donaldson, Branden Grace, Michael Hoey, Thongchai Jaidee, Marc Leishman, Tom Lewis, Joost Luiten, Toshinori Muto, Scott Piercy, Ted Potter Jr., Robert Rock, Marcel Siem, Jeev Milkha Singh, Lee Slattery, Kyle Stanley, Johnson Wagner, Bernd Wiesberger, Danny Willett

5. The winner of selected tournaments from each of the following tours:
Asian Tour: Thailand Golf Championship (2011) – Lee Westwood, also qualified in categories 2 and 3
PGA Tour of Australasia: JBWere Masters (2011) – Ian Poulter, also qualified in categories 2 and 3
Japan Golf Tour: Bridgestone Open (2011) – Toru Taniguchi
Japan Golf Tour: Japan Golf Tour Championship (2012) – Yoshinori Fujimoto
Sunshine Tour: Dimension Data Pro-Am (2012) – Oliver Bekker

Nine of the field were appearing in their first WGC event: Oliver Bekker, Jamie Donaldson,  Yoshinori Fujimoto, Joost Luiten, Toshinori Muto, Scott Piercy, Ted Potter Jr., Marcel Siem and Bernd Wiesberger.

Past champions in the field 

Source:

Round summaries

First round
Thursday, August 2, 2012

Source:

Second round
Friday, August 3, 2012

Source:

Third round
Saturday, August 4, 2012

Source:

Final round
Sunday, August 5, 2012

Source:

Scorecard
Final round

Cumulative tournament scores, relative to par

Source:

References

External links

Coverage on European Tour's official site
Firestone Country Club site

WGC Invitational
WGC-Bridgestone Invitational
WGC-Bridgestone Invitational
WGC-Bridgestone Invitational
WGC-Bridgestone Invitational